An optical neural network is a physical implementation of an artificial neural network  with optical components.  Early optical neural networks used a photorefractive Volume hologram to interconnect arrays of input neurons to arrays of output with synaptic weights in proportion to the multiplexed hologram's strength.  Volume holograms were further multiplexed using spectral hole burning to add one dimension of wavelength to space to achieve four dimensional interconnects of two dimensional arrays of neural inputs and outputs.  This research led to extensive research on alternative methods using the strength of the optical interconnect for implementing neuronal communications. 

Some artificial neural networks that have been implemented as optical neural networks include the Hopfield neural network and the Kohonen self-organizing map with liquid crystal spatial light modulators  Optical neural networks can also be based on the principles of neuromorphic engineering, creating neuromorphic photonic systems. Typically, these systems encode information in the networks using spikes, mimicking the functionality of spiking neural networks in optical and photonic hardware. Photonic devices that have demonstrated neuromorphic functionalities include (among others) vertical-cavity surface-emitting lasers, integrated photonic modulators, optoelectronic systems based on superconducting Josephson junctions or systems based on resonant tunnelling diodes.

Electrochemical vs. optical neural networks 
Biological neural networks function on an electrochemical basis, while optical neural networks use electromagnetic waves. Optical interfaces to biological neural networks can be created with optogenetics, but is not the same as an optical neural networks. In biological neural networks there exist a lot of different mechanisms for dynamically changing the state of the neurons, these include short-term and long-term synaptic plasticity. Synaptic plasticity is among the electrophysiological phenomena used to control the efficiency of synaptic transmission, long-term for learning and memory, and short-term for short transient changes in synaptic transmission efficiency. Implementing this with optical components is difficult, and ideally requires advanced photonic materials. Properties that might be desirable in photonic materials for optical neural networks include the ability to change their efficiency of transmitting light, based on the intensity of incoming light.

Implementations 
In 2007 there was one model of Optical Neural Network: the Programmable Optical Array/Analogic Computer (POAC). It had been implemented in the year 2000 and reported based on modified Joint Fourier Transform Correlator (JTC) and Bacteriorhodopsin (BR) as a holographic optical memory. Full parallelism, large array size and the speed of light are three promises offered by POAC to implement an optical CNN. They had been investigated during the last years with their practical limitations and considerations yielding the design of the first portable POAC version.

The practical details – hardware (optical setups) and software (optical templates) – were published. However, POAC is a general purpose and programmable array computer that has a wide range of applications including:
 image processing
 pattern recognition
 target tracking
 real-time video processing
 document security
 optical switching

See also 
Optical computing
Quantum neural network

References 

Artificial neural networks
Photonics